Red Fork Range is a 1931 American pre-Code Western film directed by Alan James and starring Hal Taliaferro, Ruth Mix and Al Ferguson.

Main cast
 Hal Taliaferro as Wally Hamilton 
 Ruth Mix as Ruth Farell 
 Al Ferguson as Black Bard 
 Cliff Lyons as 'Skeeter' Beldon 
 Bud Osborne as 'Whip' Roden 
 Lafe McKee as Charles Farell / Colonel Leading Wagon Train 
 Will Armstrong as Sergeant O'Flaherty 
 George Gerwing as Henchman Steve Alden 
 Jim Corey as 'Apache' Joe 
 Chief John Big Tree as Chief Barking Fox

Plot
Hamilton wins a stagecoach race, overcomes a group of troublesome Indians, and rescues Farrel from outlaw Bard.

References

Bibliography
 Michael R. Pitts. Poverty Row Studios, 1929–1940: An Illustrated History of 55 Independent Film Companies, with a Filmography for Each. McFarland & Company, 2005.

External links
 

1931 films
1931 Western (genre) films
American Western (genre) films
Films directed by Alan James
1930s English-language films
1930s American films